Elisabeth Loewe (1924, in Breslau – 1996, in Bremen) was a German artist of the Post- Expressionism.

Life
Born in Breslau to Jewish parents, she contracted Poliomyelitis as a nine-year-old, which resulted in a severe physical disability.
It was still possible for her parents to leave Breslau in 1939 for Chile, where the family found a fresh beginning.
The German reparation policy (Federal Law of Compensation for victims of national-socialist persecution) granted Elisabeth Loewe a scholarship at the Ruprecht-Karls-University in Heidelberg, where she studied Psychology from 1958.

A Psychoanalysis showed her the path to painting. In 1961 she commenced art studies at the University for Arts in Berlin, with Professors Ernst Schumacher (painter), Peter Jansen, Hans Jaenisch and Rudolf Bednarzcik.

From 1970 she lived in Bremen as a freelance painter.

Her narrative art tries to find a stylistic connection of Latin American folk art and a form of expression in Jewish art of Eastern Europe. She finds her themes mainly in Russian fairy tales and in the Jewish mythology.

Exhibitions
1964 Haus am Lützowplatz, Berlin
1965 Rathaus Schöneberg, Berlin
1965 Galerie Hamburg 13
1966 Galerie Neupert Zürich
1967 Galerie Hamburg 13
1969 Galerie Vallombreuse, Biarritz
1970 Galerie Mouffe, Paris
1971 Paula Modersohn-Becker Museum, Bremen
1973 Deutsch-Ibero-Amerikanische Gesellschaft,  Frankfurt am Main
1975 Kunsthalle Bremen
1983 Neue Worpsweder Galerie Worpswede
1986 and 1987 Galerie Steinbrecher, Bremen
1990 Haus der Bürgerschaft
1995 KulturAmbulanz Galerie im Park, Bremen
1996 Kunstverein Langenhagen
1997 Galerie Steinbrecher und Kunstverein Achim with Dagmar Calais
1998 Kunsthaus Knapstein and townhall Sundern

Awards
1970 Diplôme d'Honneur Salon International Automne Biarritz.

References

Sources
Christoph Meckel, Die Malerin Elisabeth Loewe, in „Die Waage“  Bd. 11, 1972

1924 births
1996 deaths
20th-century German painters
20th-century German women artists
German women painters
German expatriates in Chile